Lake Pleshcheyevo is a glacial lake in Yaroslavl Oblast, Russia. The historic town of Pereslavl-Zalessky is on the southeastern side of the lake.

The lake, which is part of Pleshcheyevo Ozero National Park, covers an area of over 51 km2, its length being  and its shoreline . The lake is well known for camping, swimming, fishing, and hot air ballooning.

History
The Primary Chronicle refers to the Lake of Kleshchin, which was a Meryan town on its shore. The major relic of Kleshchin is a legendary twelve-ton boulder, the "Blue stone", which was worshipped by pagans in centuries past, and is still a venue for celebrating Russian Orthodox holidays.

In 1688–1693, Peter the Great built his famous "funny flotilla" (i. e. training flotilla) on Lake Pleshcheyevo for his own amusement, including the so-called Peter's little boat, which would be considered one of the forefathers of the Russian fleet. The Botik (small boat) museum in Pereslavl-Zalessky chronicles the history of the first Russian fleet and keeps one of the original ship models.

In 1925, author Mikhail Prishvin spent a year at a research station near the lake and wrote up his observations of the landscape in his work The Springs of Berendey.

Fishing 
The lake is noted for its associations with vendace, or "freshwater herring" (ryapushka in Russian). Pereslavl's coat of arms has two golden ryapushka on a black ground. This town was known in the Middle Ages for exporting smoked ryapushka, which was the favorite fish at the Tsars' table.

See also
List of lakes of Russia
Neva Yacht Club

References

External links
  
 First-Class Camping & Hiking

Pleshcheyevo
Pereslavl-Zalessky
Tourist attractions in Yaroslavl Oblast
Parks in Russia